The 1982–83 Los Angeles Kings season, was the Kings' 16th season in the National Hockey League. It saw the Kings miss the playoffs, finishing last in the Smythe Division.

Offseason
Goaltender Gary Laskoski attended the camp on a tryout basis. He had played four years at St. Lawrence University, but had never been drafted. Based on his performance at camp, Laskoski was named the number one goalie for the team. Laskoski was not signed to a contract until after several regular season games, earning $200 per game.

Regular season
One highlight came on January 18, when Laskoski and the Kings ended Wayne Gretzky's consecutive goal streak at 30. However, it was one of the few highlights as the Kings finished last in the division. The Kings finished with the fewest goals scored in the Division and the highest goals against in the division. Laskoski played in 46 games as the number one goalie, but the team played four other goalies in the backup role.

Final standings

Schedule and results

Player statistics

Awards and records
 Marcel Dionne - Kings' representative at the NHL All-Star Game.

Transactions
The Kings were involved in the following transactions during the 1982–83 season.

Trades

Free agent signings

Free agents lost

Waivers

Draft picks
Los Angeles's draft picks at the 1982 NHL Entry Draft held at the Montreal Forum in Montreal, Quebec.

Farm teams

See also
1982–83 NHL season

References

External links

Los Angeles Kings seasons
Los Angeles Kings
Los Angeles Kings
Los Angeles
Los Angeles